Hajjiabad-e Korbal (also Romanized as Ḩājjīābād-e Korbāl and Haji Abad Korbal; also known as Ḩājjīābād and Ḩajīābād) is a village in Sofla Rural District, in the Central District of Kharameh County, Fars Province, Iran. At the 2006 census, its population was 172, in 45 families.

References 

Populated places in Kharameh County